Frank Watkin (30 March 1904 – 26 January 1979) was an English footballer who played at centre-forward for Congleton Town, Stoke City, and Port Vale. He won the Third Division North title with both Stoke and Vale, but never nailed down a regular first team place despite scoring a combined total of 12 goals in 18 league games for the two clubs. His brother, Arthur Watkin, was also a footballer who played for Stoke.

Career
Watkin played for Congleton Town, before joining Stoke City. He featured in five Third Division North games in the 1926–27 title winning season, and scored in three games in a row: a 2–1 win over Crewe Alexandra at the Victoria Ground (12 March), a 2–2 draw with Stockport County at Edgeley Park (19 March), and a 4–0 home win over Southport (26 March). However this was the extent of his appearances with the "Potters".

He was signed by local rivals Port Vale in June 1929. He picked up a knee injury in a 2–2 draw at Rotherham United on 19 October 1929, which kept him on the sidelines for four months. He made his return in style, gaining revenge over Rotherham by scoring five goals in a 7–1 win over them at the reverse fixture at The Old Recreation Ground on 22 February. He finished the 1929–30 Third Division North title winning season with nine goals in 13 appearances. He struggled to nail down a place in the side though, and never featured in the 1930–31 Second Division season. He was given a free transfer back to former club Congleton in April 1931.

Career statistics
Source:

Honours
Stoke City
Football League Third Division North: 1926–27

Port Vale
Football League Third Division North: 1929–30

References

Footballers from Stoke-on-Trent
English footballers
Association football forwards
Congleton Town F.C. players
Stoke City F.C. players
Port Vale F.C. players
English Football League players
1904 births
1979 deaths